The 1975 Soviet Cup was an association football cup competition of the Soviet Union. The winner of the competition, Ararat Yerevan qualified for the continental tournament.

Competition schedule

Preliminary round
 [Mar 16] 
 ALGA Frunze                2-1  Kuban Krasnodar 
   [Almaz Chokmorov 6, Vladimir Melnichenko ? - Alexandr Chugunov 16. Att: 10,000] 
 Kuzbass Kemerovo           0-1  ZVEZDA Perm 
   [Vladimir Murin. Att: 200 (in Eshera)] 
 METALLURG Zaporozhye       2-1  Spartak Ivano-Frankovsk    [aet] 
   [Viktor Kolodin 85, Alexandr Smirnov 94 - Vladimir Mukomelov 42] 
 NEFTCHI Baku               1-0  Torpedo Kutaisi 
 PAMIR Dushanbe             2-0  Spartak Nalchik 
   [Alexandr Pogorelov ?, Shuhrat Azamov 42. Att: 11,000] 
 Spartak Orjonikidze        1-2  METALLIST Kharkov 
   [Georgiy Kaishauri – Oleg Kramarenko, Sergei Malko. Att: 4,000 (in Sukhumi)] 
 TAVRIA Simferopol          3-0  Rubin Kazan 
   [Nikolai Klimov 15, 21, Andrei Cheremisin 41. Att: 10,000] 
 UralMash Sverdlovsk        1-2  SHINNIK Yaroslavl 
   [Alexandr Zhuravlyov 18 pen – Alexandr Smirnov 36 pen, Valeriy Sheludko 40. Att: 1,000 (in Adler)]

First round
 [Mar 22] 
 Shakhtyor Donetsk          0-1  ZVEZDA Perm 
   [Anatoliy Malyarov 86. Att: 500 (in Sochi)] 
 [Mar 23] 
 ARARAT Yerevan             4-1  Krylya Sovetov Kuibyshev 
   [Nikolai Kazaryan 55, 75, Arkadiy Andriasyan 71, 77 - Alexandr Kupriyanov 49. Att: 28,000] 
 Chernomorets Odessa        1-2  SHINNIK Yaroslavl 
   [Nikolai Mikhailov 15 – Yuriy Panteleyev 11, Dmitriy Dimitriadi 25. Att: 500 (in Adler)] 
 CSKA Moskva                3-2  Tavria Simferopol 
   [Vladimir Dorofeyev 23, 37, Boris Kopeikin 62 – Nikolai Klimov 55, Ivan Avdeyev 80. Att: 4,000 (in Sochi)] 
 DINAMO Moskva              w/o  Alga Frunze 
 DINAMO Tbilisi             2-1  Metallurg Zaporozhye 
   [Manuchar Machaidze 53, 54 - Nikolai Penzin 13. Att: 15,000] 
 Dnepr Dnepropetrovsk       1-2  PAMIR Dushanbe 
   [Anatoliy Rodionov (P) 83 og – Vladimir Gulyamhaydarov 44, Viktor Maslov (D) 82 og] 
 KARPATY Lvov               4-0  Neftchi Baku 
   [Gennadiy Likhachov 22, 82, Yaroslav Kikot 28, 79. Att: 10,000] 
 KAYRAT Alma-Ata            3-0  Torpedo Moskva 
   [Boris Yevdokimov 11, 69, Anatoliy Ionkin 57. Att: 20,000 (in Chimkent)] 
 Metallist Kharkov          1-4  PAHTAKOR Tashkent 
   [Iosif Bordash 30 pen – Vassilis Hatzipanagis 14, Vladimir Fyodorov 53, Mikhail An 67 pen, Yevgeniy Zhukov 87. Att: 15,000] 
 Nistru Kishinev            0-1  LOKOMOTIV Moskva           [aet] 
   [Vladimir Malinin 118. Att: 20,000] 
 ZARYA Voroshilovgrad       1-0  SKA Rostov-na-Donu 
   [Viktor Kuznetsov 28] 
 ZENIT Leningrad            1-0  Dinamo Minsk 
   [Anatoliy Zinchenko 4. Att: 7,000 (in Sukhumi)]

Second round
 [Apr 5] 
 Zvezda Perm                0-0  KAYRAT Alma-Ata       [pen 2-4] 
   [Att: 1,000 (in Sochi)] 
 [Apr 6] 
 ARARAT Yerevan             1-0  Karpaty Lvov          [aet] 
   [Levon Ishtoyan 118 pen. Att: 25,000] 
 LOKOMOTIV Moskva           2-1  Dinamo Moskva         [aet] 
   [Vladimir Utkin 76, Sergei Kamzulin 103 – Anatoliy Shepel 67. Att: 30,000] 
 PAHTAKOR Tashkent          1-1  Spartak Moskva        [pen 5-4] 
   [Yuriy Belov 51 – Alexandr Piskaryov 37. Att: 25,000] 
 Pamir Dushanbe             0-0  ZARYA Voroshilovgrad  [pen 2-3] 
   [Att: 20,000] 
 Shinnik Yaroslavl          0-1  CSKA Moskva 
   [Boris Kopeikin 61. Att: 1,000 (in Adler)] 
 Zenit Leningrad            0-0  DINAMO Tbilisi        [pen 2-4] 
   [Att: 12,000 (in Sochi)]

Quarterfinals
 [Jul 2] 
 DINAMO Tbilisi          2-1  Dinamo Kiev           [aet] 
   [Vakhtang Koridze 94, David Kipiani 110 – Viktor Kolotov 109. Att: 35,000] 
 Lokomotiv Moskva        1-1  ARARAT Yerevan        [pen 3-5] 
   [Viktor Davydov 50 – Arkadiy Andriasyan 57 pen. Att: 22,000] 
 Pahtakor Tashkent       0-0  ZARYA Voroshilovgrad  [pen 2-4] 
   [Att: 30,000] 
 [Jul 3] 
 CSKA Moskva             3-0  Kayrat Alma-Ata 
   [Boris Kopeikin 5, 71, Sergei Shlapak 54. Att: 15,000]

Semifinals
 [Jul 16] 
 ARARAT Yerevan          3-1  Dinamo Tbilisi 
   [Eduard Markarov 47, Sergei Pogosov 58, Nazar Petrosyan 64 – Vakhtang Koridze 78. Att: 68,600] 
 ZARYA Voroshilovgrad    2-1  CSKA Moskva              [aet] 
   [Anatoliy Kuksov 26, Vladimir Belousov 110 – Nikolai Hudiyev 69. Att: 30,000]

Final

External links
 Complete calendar. helmsoccer.narod.ru
 1975 Soviet Cup. Footballfacts.ru
 1975 Soviet football season. RSSSF

Soviet Cup seasons
Cup
Soviet Cup
Soviet Cup